John Nywaman (fl. 1404) of Exeter, Devon, was an English politician.

Family
Nywaman married a woman named Agnes.

Career
He was a Member (MP) of the Parliament of England for Exeter in 1404.

References

14th-century births
15th-century deaths
English MPs January 1404
Members of the Parliament of England (pre-1707) for Exeter